The Gakhar are a Punjabi clan found predominantly in the Jhelum District and Gujranwala District in Punjab province of Pakistan. The Gakhars now predominantly follow Islam after conversion from Hinduism during the Islamic rule of north India.

Medieval history
The Gakhars had engaged in a long-running struggle for sovereignty over the Salt Range. After the arrival of Muhammad of Ghor to medieval India, the Gakhars converted from Hinduism to Islam.

See also
 Sarang Gakhar, Chief of Gakhars
 List of Punjabi tribes
 Gakhar Mandi

References

Further reading
Gakkhar, A. S Bazmee Ansari, in Encyclopedia of Islam, 2nd ed.,Edited by J.H.Kramers et al., E.J Brill, Leiden, pp. 972–74.

Punjabi people
Punjabi tribes
Social groups of Pakistan
Social groups of Punjab, Pakistan